Antanambao Manampotsy is a and district located in the Atsinanana Region of eastern Madagascar.

Communes
The district is further divided into five communes:

 Antanambao Manampotsy
 Antanandehibe
 Mahela
 Manakana
 Saivaza

References

Populated places in Atsinanana

Districts of Atsinanana